The Mount Adams Incline was a funicular, or inclined railway, located in the Cincinnati neighborhood of Mount Adams. Completed in 1872, it was the longest-running of the city's five inclines, closing in 1948. It has since been demolished.

See also
Funicular railway
List of funicular railways

References

External links
Cincinnati Transit: Mt. Adams Incline
Mt Adams Incline Model website & History

Defunct funicular railways in the United States
Passenger rail transportation in Cincinnati
History of Cincinnati
Standard gauge railways in the United States
Railway inclines in the United States
1872 establishments in Ohio
1948 disestablishments in Ohio
Railway lines opened in 1872
Railway lines closed in 1948